Figures on a Beach was an American new wave band from Detroit, Michigan that was active from 1981 to 1991. The band had two successful singles in 1989: "Accidentally 4th Street (Gloria)", which reached #14 on the Billboard Modern Rock Tracks chart and a cover of Bachman-Turner Overdrive's "You Ain't Seen Nothing Yet", which peaked at #64 on the Billboard Hot 100.

History
Figures on a Beach was formed in Detroit, Michigan, United States, in the early 1980s from the ashes of the band Razor 1922. The group was composed of vocalist Anthony Kaczynski, guitarist  John "Rik" Rolski, keyboardist Christopher Ewen, bassist Perry Tell and drummer Michael Smith. The group recorded an independent EP, Swimming in 1983, and the Don Was-produced single "Breathless" in 1984.

Figures moved to Boston, Massachusetts, in 1985 and was signed by Seymour Stein of Sire Records soon afterward. They released their first full-length album in 1987, titled Standing on Ceremony. A self-titled LP (Figures on a Beach) followed in 1989, containing a hit cover of Bachman–Turner Overdrive's "You Ain't Seen Nothing Yet" and a single titled "Accidentally 4th Street (Gloria)". The group disbanded in 1991.

Chris Ewen went on to form Future Bible Heroes, a collaboration with Stephin Merritt and Claudia Gonson from The Magnetic Fields. Kaczynski performed Merritt's vocals on Future Bible Heroes' 2013 tour, which Merritt opted to skip. Ewen and Kaczynski performed on the Magnetic Fields 2017 tour for Merritt's 50 Song Memoir.In 2022 they became full members of The Magnetic Fields and toured the USA and Europe. 

Anthony Kaczynski and Michael Smith went on to form Fireking.

Michael Smith currently performs as Smitt E. Smitty and Little Billy Lost.

"Accidentally 4th Street (Gloria)" was covered by The Echoing Green on the band's self-titled album.

Charting singles

Discography

Albums 
 Paradise And Other Four Letter Words (Metro America, 1985)
 Standing On Ceremony (Sire, 1987)
 Figures on a Beach (Sire, 1989)

Singles 
 Swimming EP (Metro America, 1983)
 "Breathless" (Metro America, 1984)
 "In Camera Obscura/Paradise" (Metro America, 1985)
 "No Stars" (Sire, 1987)
 "Accidentally 4th St. (Gloria)" (Sire, 1989)
 "You Ain't Seen Nothing Yet" (Sire, 1989)

Compilation albums 
 Just Say Yes... (Sire, 1987)
 Just Say Mao (Sire, 1989)

References

American new wave musical groups
American pop music groups
Musical groups established in 1981
Musical groups disestablished in 1991
Musical groups from Detroit
Sire Records artists
1981 establishments in Michigan